Contradusta walkeri is a species of sea snail, a cowry, a marine gastropod mollusk in the family Cypraeidae, the cowries.

Subspecies
Contradusta walkeri continens (Iredale, 1935)  
Contradusta walkeri surabajensis Schilder, F.A., 1937 
Contradusta walkeri walkeri (Sowerby I, 1832)

Description
The shape is usually oval, the dorsum surface is smooth and shiny, the basic color is pale brown, with a wide dark brown trasversal band and some small irregular brown patches on the top. The margins are white, with several brown dots. The base may be white, purple or cream and the wide and sinuous aperture shows long labial teeth. The interior of the shell may be purple. In the living cowries the mantle is transparent, with short sensorial papillae.

Distribution
This species is distributed in the Red Sea, in the Indian Ocean along the Seychelles, in the West Pacific along South East Asia, the Philippines, Melanesia and Australia.

Habitat

References

External links
 Biolib
 Clade

Cypraeidae
Gastropods described in 1832